was a Japanese film director who worked in several different genres.

Career
Born in Yonago, Okamoto attended Meiji University, but was drafted into the Air Force 1943 and entered World War II, an experience that had a profound effect on his later film work, one third of which dealt with war. Finally graduating after the war, he entered the Toho studies in 1947 and worked as an assistant under such directors as Mikio Naruse, Masahiro Makino, Ishirō Honda, and Senkichi Taniguchi. He made his debut as a director in 1958 with All About Marriage.

Okamoto directed almost 40 films and wrote the scripts for at least 24, in a career that spanned almost six decades. He worked in a variety of genres, but most memorably in action genres such as the jidaigeki and war films. He was known for making films with a twist. Inspired to become a filmmaker after watching John Ford's Stagecoach, he would insert elements of the Western in war films like Desperado Outpost (1959) and Westward Desperado (1960), and eventually even filmed his own samurai Western in East Meets West (1995). A fan of musicals, he made over-the-top films such as Oh Bomb (1964), a gangster Noh musical, and Dixieland Daimyo (1986), about jazz musicians entering Bakumatsu Japan. Over all, he took on "a very rhythmic approach to filming and editing action sequences. Carefully timed placement of sound effects and music combined with camera movement and movement within the frame to form a very rhythmic, almost musical whole." His basically critical stance towards Japanese society led him to often pursue satire and black comedy, with his The Age of Assassins (1967) becoming so dark and absurd, Toho initially refused to release it.

Okamoto could also be serious. His samurai films, such as Samurai Assassin (1965), starring Toshiro Mifune, about a group of 19th century political agitators planning to kill an important government official, The Sword of Doom (1966), or Kill! (1968), were often critical of bushidō and Tokugawa period Japan. Yet he approached this critique from his own perspective. Toho entrusted him with the epic Japan's Longest Day (1968), a cinematic version of what happened to official Japan at the end of the war, but the next year he also made The Human Bullet for Art Theatre Guild, a more personal and satirical vision of an everyman's experience of World War II. To pursue some of his projects, Okamoto formed Okamoto Productions. His wife, Mineko Okamoto, often worked as producer on his later works.

He won the 1992 Japan Academy Prize for Director of the Year for Rainbow Kids. Alongside Akira Kurosawa, Okamoto was also a candidate for directing the Japanese sequences for Tora! Tora! Tora! (1970) but instead Kinji Fukasaku and Toshio Masuda were chosen.

On February 19, 2005, just two days after his 81st birthday, Okamoto died at home from esophageal cancer.

A photograph of Okamoto was used to portray the character of Goro Maki in the 2016 film Shin Godzilla, which was directed by Hideaki Anno, a self-professed fan of Okamoto.

Selected filmography

Appearance
 Shin Godzilla (2016) as Goro Maki (stock photo double)

References

External links
 
 

1924 births
2005 deaths
Deaths from esophageal cancer
People from Yonago, Tottori
Japan Academy Prize for Director of the Year winners
Japanese film directors
Samurai film directors
Deaths from cancer in Japan
Japanese military personnel of World War II